Eternal Blue is the debut studio album by Canadian heavy metal band Spiritbox. It was released on September 17, 2021, through the band's own Pale Chord Records in partnership with Rise Records. Work began in 2018 but was suspended due to the COVID-19 pandemic, which delayed the album release initially slated for April 2020. Spiritbox relocated to Joshua Tree, California, and completed the songwriting process for the album, which former Volumes guitarist Dan Braunstein and the band's guitarist Mike Stringer produced. The recording was finished by Braunstein in February 2021. Eternal Blue contains an array of metal genres and subgenres with electronic elements as part of Spiritbox's dynamic, while singer Courtney LaPlante employs both screamed and clean vocals.

In advance of the record's release, five songs became singles, "Holy Roller", "Constance", "Circle With Me", "Secret Garden", and "Hurt You", all of which have recorded entries on the American Billboard charts. Music critics reviewed the album positively, who generally praised its production, songwriting, and musicianship. Eternal Blue proved an immediate chart success for the band, recording entries in eight countries and debuting at number thirteen on the Billboard 200. The release marks the only studio album with bassist Bill Crook, who left the band in May 2022.

Background
Before co-founding Spiritbox, singer Courtney LaPlante and guitarist Mike Stringer were both in Iwrestledabearonce. In late 2015, they decided to quit the band. LaPlante and Stringer had each replaced a previous member of Iwrestledabearonce, and were never comfortable with that status in the band; the two also desired to pursue a new personal and creative direction. On October 9, 2017, the duo announced the launch of their new project named Spiritbox.

As Spiritbox, the couple released a seven-song self-titled debut extended play on October 27, 2017, preceded by the single "The Beauty of Suffering". Former Iwrestledabearonce bandmate Mikey Montgomery served as the band's first drummer to record the EP. The band was later joined by Bill Crook of the pop-punk band Living with Lions as bassist, and Shreddy Krueger drummer Ryan Loerke became the band's first permanent drummer. The band shared five singles which were eventually compiled into an EP titled Singles Collection on April 26, 2019, followed by the non-album singles "Rule of Nines" and "Blessed Be" in 2019 and 2020. It was accomplished through their experience of the DIY recording process, although the mixing and mastering were done in another studio. Loerke would depart from Spiritbox in 2020, and was subsequently replaced by Philadelphia-based drummer Zev Rose. The band members met Rose only two days before the group began performing with him on a tour that was canceled in March 2020 due to the COVID-19 pandemic.

Composition
Spiritbox employed several heavy metal-based musical styles on Eternal Blue. Critics have identified the style on the album as metalcore, post-metal, djent, progressive metal, and alternative metal. The record was also labelled "post-metalcore" and a "nu-metal-meets-djent riff-fest". Near the release of the record, LaPlante herself defined the musical genre of Spiritbox as metalcore. LaPlante makes use of both screaming and singing throughout the record.

The band's use of the digital synthesizer provided a unique sonic aspect to Eternal Blue, displaying aspects ranging from atmospheric to industrial. This approach led Guitar World to describe Spiritbox as "digitally infused metal" upon the release of what became the album's first single, "Holy Roller". Spiritbox said they derived inspiration related to this approach from the 1980s pop music scene, Nine Inch Nails, and early post-punk bands such as the Cure in an interview following the album's release; specifically, minimalist "airy" song structures characteristic of 1980s dark rock served as an important base to the music on Eternal Blue.

Recording and release
The songwriting for Spiritbox's debut album commenced early, and most of the songs were written throughout 2018 and 2019. The song "Holy Roller" was written in January 2020 and they performed the unfinished track on a European tour in March. The album was initially scheduled for an April 2020 release; however, the process was interrupted during the COVID-19 pandemic. The band then paused to assess the situation in the world and decided to release the single "Holy Roller" in the meantime. In September 2020, Spiritbox announced that they had signed with Rise Records, as part of the label's partnership with Pale Chord Records. The band started pre-production on the album with their producer Dan Braunstein via Zoom. Meanwhile, "super popular" music videos released by the band increased anticipation of the album.

By January 2021, Revolver had dubbed Spiritbox's upcoming full-length release as one of its "60 Most Anticipated Albums of 2021". Eventually, the band reconvened in Joshua Tree, California, to continue working in "their own bubble", which allowed them to continue writing songs and revising existing material in a context of proximity to each other during the pandemic. The band set a deadline of April 2021 to finish work on the album so it could be released by the end of 2021. The album was produced by Braunstein and the band guitarist, Mike Stringer. Braunstein recorded it along with the band at an Airbnb rental house located on a 20-acre desert property in Joshua Tree, in complete isolation. Eternal Blue was recorded over a period of three weeks in February, and the process was finished by the beginning of March. The band sold 6,500 vinyl pre-orders within 24 hours of announcing the album's release date. Eternal Blue was finally released on September 17.

Singles
Spiritbox first found critical and commercial success with "Holy Roller", released on July 3, 2020. The band teamed up with Revolver to premiere the single with an accompanying music video. It debuted at No. 25 on the US Billboard Hot Hard Rock Songs and climbed to No. 12 six months later. The song's original version spent seven weeks as No. 1 on Sirius XM Liquid Metal's Devil's Dozen, and was deemed the best song of 2020 by the station's listeners. The band subsequently released a remix of "Holy Roller" in October, which featured Ryo Kinoshita of Crystal Lake.  The "Holy Roller" remix version spent five weeks as No. 2 on Sirius XM Liquid Metal's Devil's Dozen. On December 4, 2020, Spiritbox debuted "Constance", whose LaPlante wrote the lyrics at the same moment the music video was conceived and created by director Dylan Hryciuk. The song and its music were dedicated to Phyllis, LaPlante's grandmother, who could not say the last goodbye to her before her death because of the pandemic, nor attend her funeral. Hryciuk's grandmother, Constance, was the song's namesake. She was battling the late stages of dementia at the time of the video's release, and the music video was dedicated to her. Described as a "massive track", "Constance" earned the band further critical acclaim from critics and the metal community, showcasing the versatility and variety of styles within the band's music. That same month, a Kerrang! reader's poll voted Spiritbox as "Best New Band".

The third single from the album, "Circle With Me", which was the final song written, and its music video directed by Orie McGinness, were released on April 30, 2021. The lyrics describe the anxiety that LaPlante experiences "about messing up" her music, to her own confidence that allows her to protect herself from her self-doubt. The song displays "breathy vocals" and melodies mixing guitars and electronic instrumentation, contrasting with harsher parts and a breakdown. In mid-May, the single topped the US Billboard Hard Rock Digital Song Sales, reached No. 5 on the US Hot Hard Rock Songs, No. 12 on the US Rock Digital Song Sales, No. 50 on the US Hot Rock & Alternative Songs, and No. 71 on the US Digital Song Sales chart. It was followed by "Secret Garden" on May 25. According to LaPlante, the song showcases the "fluidity that is inherent in heavy music" and the diverse metal styles of Spiritbox. "Secret Garden" reached No. 34 on the US Billboard Mainstream Rock chart in mid-August. During the first week of August, "Constance" garnered enough public attention to hold the top position on the US Billboard Hard Rock Digital Song Sales and reach No. 19 on the US Billboard Hot Hard Rock Songs. One final single, "Hurt You", written "during a snowstorm" before the pandemic in early 2020, was shared in advance of the album on August 20. The theme of the song explores "toxic co-dependency" while choosing to fail deliberately. Hryciuk directed the music video. "Hurt You" charted at No. 20 on the US Billboard Hot Hard Rock Songs in the week of September 4, 2021.

Critical reception

Critical response to Eternal Blue was generally very positive. Giving it a perfect 5/5 score, Kerrang! reviewer Steve Beebee highlighted "dreamlike soundscapes" on "Secret Garden" and "The Summit" and the heaviness of "Silk in the Strings" and "Holy Roller" to justify the album being "the debut of the year [...] Eternal Blue is dizzying, cleansing and frightening". Although Alex Sievers of Kill Your Stereo noted that the record was "[a] somewhat flawed record" which at times overused atmospheric effects, he praised its diversity, comparing the "crushing brutality, lethal pick scrapes and genuinely awesome heaviness" of "Holy Roller" and the clean, "intimate but powerful" nature of "Constance". He also noted that "Secret Garden" had a "nuclear-grade hook" and that it was among the album's strongest material. While Metal Hammers Dannii Leivers noted that Spiritbox's combination of "beauty and brutality" was not a new concept, she noted that the material on Eternal Blue carried an "emotional heft" that improved the appeal of such work. Leivers concluded that "Eternal Blue is a staggeringly brilliant record that resoundingly delivers on the hype," and scored the release four and a half out of five stars.

Owen Morawitz at New Noise awarded Eternal Blue four out of five stars. He highlighted the album's songwriting and musical versatility, particularly on the title track "Eternal Blue" and "Halcyon", as reason to believe that "Spiritbox's debut is likely to convert even the most intractable of the band’s (few) doubters." Outburns Nathan Katsiaficas also gave special praise to "Halcyon", which encompassed all the dynamics displayed on the album. He gave the album a perfect score, calling it a "modern metal masterpiece" and that the songwriting and musicianship on it created "an absolute thrill ride from start to finish". Writing for Rock Sins, Simon Crampton summarized his review of the record as "one of the most self assured, emotionally enriching and musically diverse albums of the year", particularly noting that the crux of what made Spiritbox's work so strong was their ability to "mix the heavy & heartfelt". He graded the release as a 9/10. Robert Garland at Sputnikmusic stated, "As easy as it would be to simply lump on the praise for Spiritbox’s debut...it wouldn’t do any good for those who read this...Spiritbox have more yet to offer, more growth, more great tracks and, if we’re lucky...they might even hit all that growth on a sophomore release. Flowers will wilt, but the blue is eternal." Steven Loftin of Upset Magazine called the "simultaneously familiar and fresh." Scoring Eternal Blue an 8.5/10, Wall of Sound reviewer Paul Brown simply referred to the album as "incredible", and likened listening to it as a musical journey: "[it] connects with the listener on an emotional level and takes them on a journey of self-discovery, empathy and overcoming."

Accolades

Year-end lists

Commercial performance
Eternal Blue entered the Billboard 200 chart at No. 13 with 23,000 album-equivalent units earned  in the United States in the September 17–23 tracking period, out of which 19,000 were pure album sales. The album ranked third on the Top Album Sales in the week ending October 2, 2021, which was considered a success. The album had chart impact internationally, opening at No. 8 on the Top 50 Albums Chart in Australia, No. 17 in the Top 100 Albums in Germany, and No. 19 on the Official Albums Chart Top 100 in the United Kingdom, although it was placed at No. 8 mid-week on the UK chart on September 20, 2021. Eternal Blue topped both the ARIA Top 20 Vinyl Album and the US Billboard Vinyl Album Sales and reached No. 2 on the UK Official Vinyl Albums Chart. It reached No. 2 on the US Independent Albums chart and No. 12 on the US Tastemaker Albums chart in the week of October 2, 2021. It went on to sell over 175,000 copies worldwide in one year.

Track listing

Personnel 
Credits are adapted from the album's liner notes.

Spiritbox
 Courtney LaPlante – lead vocals
 Michael Stringer – guitar, bass, drums, background vocals (tracks 2, 3, 6, 11)
 Bill Crook – bass, background vocals (tracks 2, 3, 4, 5, 9, 10, 11, 12)
 Zev Rosenberg – drums

Additional musicians
 Daniel Braunstein – drums
 Sam Carter – additional vocals (track 3)

Production
 Daniel Braunstein – production, engineering, mixing
 Michael Stringer – co-production
 Jens Bogren – mastering

Design
 Kevin Moore – art direction, design at Soft Surrogate

Charts

Weekly charts

Year-end charts

References

Footnotes

Citations

2021 debut albums
Heavy metal albums by Canadian artists